Parzaan Dastur is an Indian actor and writer. He is best remembered as the cute kid in the Dhara advertisement and the silent Sikh kid in Kuch Kuch Hota Hai by many Indians.

Early life
Parzaan is an alumnus of Balvantray Mehta Vidya Bhawan (A.S.M.A.) in Delhi and H.R College of Commerce and Economics. He belongs to a Mumbai-based Parsi family and lives with his parents and younger brother. He is a proficient Pianist and has been learning since age 7.

Career
Parzaan made his debut in the movie Kuch Kuch Hota Hai as a Silent Sikh-Kid and became famous for his dialogue, "Tussi Jaa Rahe Ho, Tussi Na Jao." His other movies are Mohabbatein (2001), Zubeidaa (2001) and Kabhi Khushi Kabhie Gham (2001). He played Parzan in Rahul Dholakia's Parzania (2005), about a boy who goes missing during the Gujarat riots.

Parzaan played the male lead in Piyush Jha's Sikandar (2009), as a boy who aspires to be a footballer, but finds a gun, which turns his world upside down.

Parzaan also produced and released a Short Film called Pocket Mummy, with his partner Nitesh Ranglani (who directed the film). Parzaan wrote the film which stars famous actress Madhoo in a pivotal role.

Awards
He was nominated for Stardust award for Best Child Artist for his role in Sikandar (2009).

Filmography

Films

References

External links
 

1991 births
Parsi people
Living people
Male actors from Mumbai
Male actors in Hindi cinema
Indian male child actors
20th-century Indian male actors
Indian male television actors
21st-century Indian male actors